892 Seeligeria is dark Alauda asteroid from the outer region of the asteroid belt that was discovered by German astronomer Max Wolf on May 31, 1918 in Heidelberg and assigned a preliminary designation of 1918 DR. It was named after German astronomer Hugo Hans von Seeliger.

Photometric observations at the Oakley Observatory in Terre Haute, Indiana, during 2007 were used to build a light curve for 892 Seeligeria. The asteroid displayed a rotation period of 15.78 ± 0.04 hours and a brightness variation of 0.35 ± 0.07 in magnitude.

Seeligeria is a member of the Alauda family, a large family of typically bright carbonaceous asteroids and named after its parent body, 702 Alauda.

References

External links
 
 

000892
Discoveries by Max Wolf
Named minor planets
19180531